West Salem is a village in La Crosse County, Wisconsin, United States, along the La Crosse River. It is part of the La Crosse-Onalaska, WI-MN Metropolitan Statistical Area. The population was 4,799 as of the 2010 Census.

History
West Salem was platted in 1856. It was named Salem by a Baptist minister named Elder Card because the word meant "peace" in Arabic and Hebrew. The word West was added to the name when mail was confused with another town in the state named Salem.

The donation of approximately ten acres of land to a railway company led to the creation of West Salem. A station was built in West Salem on the original Milwaukee and La Crosse Railway which ran to La Crosse. It was later taken over by the Chicago, Milwaukee and St. Paul Railway (later becoming the Chicago, Milwaukee, St. Paul and Pacific Railroad). The railway used the land to build a depot and tracks.

Geography
West Salem is located at  (43.899795, -91.086614).

Demographics

2010 census
As of the census of 2010, there were 4,799 people, 1,831 households, and 1,259 families living in the village. The racial makeup of the village was 96.7% White, 0.4% African American, 0.6% Native American, 0.7% Asian, 0.3% from other races, and 1.3% from two or more races. Hispanic or Latino of any race were 1.2% of the population.

There were 1,831 households, of which 37.2% had children under the age of 18 living with them, 53.2% were married couples living together, 10.9% had a female householder with no husband present, 4.6% had a male householder with no wife present, and 31.2% were non-families. 26.9% of all households were made up of individuals, and 11.9% had someone living alone who was 65 years of age or older. The average household size was 2.48 and the average family size was 2.99.

The median age in the village was 39.2 years. 26% of residents were under the age of 18; 6.3% were between the ages of 18 and 24; 25.5% were from 25 to 44; 26.3% were from 45 to 64; and 15.9% were 65 years of age or older. The gender makeup of the village was 47.4% male and 52.6% female.

2000 census
As of the census of 2000, there were 4,541 people, 1,706 households, and 1,230 families living in the village. The population density was 1,911.2 people per square mile (736.5/km2). There were 1,765 housing units at an average density of 743.0 per square mile (286.3/km2). The racial makeup of the village was 98.04% White, 0.51% African American, 0.42% Native American, 0.44% Asian, 0.07% from other races, and 0.53% from two or more races. Hispanic or Latino of any race were 0.59% of the population.

There were 1,706 households, out of which 41.4% had children under the age of 18 living with them, 59.0% were married couples living together, 9.3% had a female householder with no husband present, and 27.9% were non-families. 23.6% of all households were made up of individuals, and 10.3% had someone living alone who was 65 years of age or older. The average household size was 2.61 and the average family size was 3.09.

In the village, the population was spread out, with 30.0% under the age of 18, 6.3% from 18 to 24, 31.9% from 25 to 44, 18.9% from 45 to 64, and 12.8% who were 65 years of age or older. The median age was 34 years. For every 100 females, there were 95.6 males. For every 100 females age 18 and over, there were 86.6 males.

The median income for a household in the village was $43,449, and the median income for a family was $50,176. Males had a median income of $34,459 versus $22,439 for females. The per capita income for the village was $19,904. About 3.3% of families and 3.5% of the population were below the poverty line, including 4.0% of those under age 18 and 3.4% of those age 65 or over.

Government
The village president is Dennis Manthei. The village administrator is Teresa Schnitzler. The village treasurer is Benjamin Heller.

Education
The public West Salem School District consists of:

 West Salem Elementary School 
 West Salem Middle School  
 West Salem High School

The private schools are:

 Coulee Region Christian School
 Christ Saint John's Lutheran School

Transportation
Bus service towards La Crosse or Tomah is provided three times daily per direction by Scenic Mississippi Regional Transit.

Historic sites
 The Hamlin Garland House
 The Palmer Brother's Octagons

Parks and recreation

Veterans Memorial Park
Lake Neshonoc
La Crosse Fairgrounds Speedway

Notable people

 Charles S. Benton, U.S. Representative from New York
 Tom Black, NBA player, graduated from high school in West Salem.
 George G. Bingham, Oregon jurist
 Frank P. Coburn, United States House of Representatives
 Hamlin Garland, writer - West Salem was his summer house, but he was born here.
 Harry W. Griswold, United States House of Representatives
 Jay L. Johnson, United States admiral
 Mabel Johnson Leland, lecturer, translator 
 Damian Miller, major league baseball player
 William F. Miller, Wisconsin legislator
 Norbert Nuttelman, Wisconsin legislator and farmer
 Arthur H. Parmelee, football coach and physician

Images

References

External links

 Village of West Salem website
 West Salem School District website
 Sanborn fire insurance maps: 1894 1898 1904 1910 1922

Villages in La Crosse County, Wisconsin
Villages in Wisconsin
Populated places established in 1856